If I Know Me is the debut studio album by American country music singer Morgan Wallen. It was released April 27, 2018, through Big Loud Records. The production on the album was handled by Joey Moi and features a guest appearance by Florida Georgia Line. 

If I Know Me was supported by four singles: "The Way I Talk", "Up Down", "Whiskey Glasses", and "Chasin' You". The album peaked at number 10 on the US Billboard 200 and number one on the US Top Country Albums chart. It was also certified platinum by the Recording Industry Association of America (RIAA) in September 2020 and double platinum in January 2022.

Singles
He released his debut single, "The Way I Talk", on September 12, 2016, and it became a top 30 hit on the Billboard Country Airplay chart. "Up Down" was released as his second single on November 27, 2017. The song, a collaboration with Florida Georgia Line, became a No. 1 hit on the Billboard Country Airplay chart for the week dated June 30, 2018. "Whiskey Glasses" was released as the album's third single on July 30, 2018, and became his second No. 1 hit on the Country Airplay chart. It was also his first to top the Billboard Hot Country Songs chart and reach the top 20 of the Billboard Hot 100. The album's fourth single "Chasin' You" was released to country radio on July 29, 2019 and became his third No. 1 on the Country Airplay chart and also his second single to reach the top 20 on the Billboard Hot 100.

Commercial performance
If I Know Me debuted at number 11 on the US Top Country Albums and number 72 on the US Billboard 200, selling 2,700 copies in the first week. In August 2020, the album reached new peaks at number 13 on the Billboard 200 and number one on the US Top Country Albums chart after a record-breaking 114 weeks. On September 4, 2020, the album was certified platinum by the Recording Industry Association of America (RIAA) for combined sales and album-equivalent units of over a million units. As of January 2021, the album has earned 1.7 million album-equivanlent units and has accumulated a total of 2.4 billion on-demand streams in the United States.

Track listing

Notes

Charts

Weekly charts

Year-end charts

Certifications

References

2018 debut albums
Morgan Wallen albums
Big Loud albums
Albums produced by Joey Moi